Namulonge is a location in the Central Region of Uganda.

Location
Namulonge is located in North Kyaddondo Constituency, Kyaddondo County, Wakiso District, in the Central Region of Uganda. The coordinates of Namulonge are:00 31 30N, 32 36 54E (Latitude:0.5250; Longitude:32.6150).

Overview
Namulonge is a small town where the main employer is the National Crops Resources Research Institute, a public agricultural research institution. A civilian airport, Namulonge Airport, belonging to Namulonge Agronometry Station is located there. There is a golf course in town.

Population
The exact population of Namulonge is not known, as of January 2010.

Points of interest
The following points of interest lie within Namulonge or close to her borders:

 The National Crop Research Institute
 Namulonge Agronometry Station - A government-owned meteorological station
 Mary Louise Sumkins Memorial Golf Course - A private golf course
 Namulonge Airport - A small civilian airport belonging to Namulonge Agronometry Station
 The Gayaza-Ziroobwe Road - The road cuts through town in a south to north direction

References 

Populated places in Central Region, Uganda
Cities in the Great Rift Valley
Wakiso District